Pérez Zeledón may refer to:

A.D. Municipal Pérez Zeledón, Costa Rican football team
Pérez Zeledón (canton), in Costa Rica
Pérez Zeledón Airport, in Costa Rica